The Coalition of Change is an upcoming political alliance in Indonesia which will be formed through agreement between three political parties, NasDem, PKS, and Demokrat, in the face 2024 Indonesian presidential election.

On 3 October 2022, Nasdem Party leader Surya Paloh officially declared Anies Baswedan as their presidential candidate for the 2024 Indonesian presidential election.

As of December 2022, Coalition of Change has not yet officially been formed from the three political parties, despite confirmations it was in the works, with current plans for formation set for January 2023.

Member parties

General election results

References 

Political party alliances in Indonesia
Political parties established in 2022